OKC Outlets is a large outlet mall located in Oklahoma City, Oklahoma. The mall was proposed to open in the fall of 2009, however plans were put on hold because of the economic recession of 2008. Construction began in July 2010. The total cost of the development was $50 million, with $3.9 million of infrastructure improvements paid for by the city of Oklahoma City. It was the largest retail investment of 2010, a down year in new retail construction.

Currently, additional wings are being planned to be added to the mall.

Notes

External links
 OKC Outlets

Shopping malls established in 2011
2011 establishments in Oklahoma
Shopping malls in Oklahoma
Buildings and structures in Oklahoma City
Economy of Oklahoma City
Tourist attractions in Oklahoma City
Outlet malls in the United States